Pope Markianos was the 8th Pope and Patriarch of Alexandria, reigning from 141 to 152.

Markianos was born in Alexandria, Egypt and he was the Dean of The Catechetical School of Alexandria, before being appointed Patriarch in the month of Hathor in the year 141 AD during the reign of the Emperor Antoninus Pius. 

He died on the 6th of Tobi, in the year 152 AD.

References 

General

Atiya, Aziz S. The Coptic Encyclopedia. New York: Macmillan Publishing Co., 1991.

External links 
 The Official website of the Coptic Orthodox Pope of Alexandria and Patriarch of All Africa on the Holy See of Saint Mark the Apostle
 Coptic Documents in French

152 deaths
Deans of the Catechetical School of Alexandria
Saints from Roman Egypt
2nd-century Popes and Patriarchs of Alexandria
2nd-century Christian saints
Year of birth unknown